The Sentimental Agent is a television drama series spin-off from Man of the World. It was produced in the United Kingdom in 1963 by Associated Television and distributed by ITC Entertainment.

The series ran for 13 one-hour monochrome episodes. Some of the episodes were edited into a feature film Our Man in the Caribbean released in 1962.

Plot
The series stars Carlos Thompson as Argentinian Carlos Varela, a successful import-export agent based in London.

Now based in London, Varela's company takes him into unusual and sometimes dangerous situations. Impeccably dressed, cigar smoking and using his wit, ingenuity, and charm, which would often involve a damsel in distress. Assisted by Chin, a resourceful Chinese manservant, and Miss Carter, an ultra-efficient secretary.

Later episodes introduced Bill Randall, a businessman, who became the boyfriend of Miss Carter and then an employee of Varela.

Cast and characters

Carlos Thompson as Carlos Varela
Burt Kwouk as Chin Sung
John Turner as Bill Randall
Clemence Bettany as Miss Suzy Carter

Carlos Thompson did not appear in production episodes 110, 111, 112, and only briefly at the beginning and end of 113.

Guest stars included: Warren Mitchell, Diana Rigg, Imogen Hassall, Patrick Troughton, Ann Bell, Carol Cleveland, Annette Andre, and Donald Sutherland.

Episode list
Filmed on location and at Shepperton Studios

Airdate is for ATV London. ITV regions varied date and order.

Production number is of the Network DVD order.

Music
The series' theme music, "Carlos' Theme", was written by Ivor Slaney who was also the director of incidental music using some musical cues of Edwin Astley.

Slaney released "Carlos' Theme" as a single in September 1963 on the HMV record label, as did Johnny Keating in January 1964 on the Piccadilly label, but neither version reached the charts.

DVD release
Network released the 13 episodes on DVD in April 2010. Review_.

References

External links
 

1963 British television series debuts
1963 British television series endings
1960s British drama television series
British crime television series
British television miniseries
Television series by ITC Entertainment
ITV television dramas
Television shows produced by Associated Television (ATV)
English-language television shows
Black-and-white British television shows